Duregi (Kaitag: Ттурей) is a rural locality (a selo) in Shilyaginsky Selsoviet, Kaytagsky District, Republic of Dagestan, Russia. The population was 270 as of 2010. There are 13 streets.

Geography 
Duregi is located 15 km southwest of Madzhalis (the district's administrative centre) by road. Shilyagi and Kulidzha are the nearest rural localities.

Nationalities 
Dargins live there.

References 

Rural localities in Kaytagsky District